Francis Lachlan Ellis (7 July 1883 – 7 May 1957) was an Australian rules footballer who played with Richmond and Melbourne in the Victorian Football League (VFL).

Notes

External links 

1883 births
1957 deaths
Australian rules footballers from Victoria (Australia)
Richmond Football Club players
Melbourne Football Club players